The Hospital of the University of Pennsylvania (HUP) is the flagship hospital of Penn Medicine and is located in the University City section of West Philadelphia. It is consistently ranked as one of the top hospitals in the United States.

History

The hospital was founded at its current location in 1874 by the University of Pennsylvania School of Medicine, making it the oldest university-owned teaching hospital in the country.

The hospital is located on the campus of the University of Pennsylvania, along with several other related organizations including a medical school, a nursing school, veterinary and dental schools, research laboratories and outpatient facilities including the Abramson Cancer Center and the Roberts Proton Therapy Center. The Children's Hospital of Philadelphia (CHOP) is also located on this campus. Although it engages in many collaborative efforts with Penn Medicine, CHOP is not part of the University of Pennsylvania Health System.

The Chester County Hospital and Health System joined Penn Medicine in 2013. Two years later, Lancaster General Health (LG Health) joined the UPHS family. Princeton Health officially merged into UPHS in January 2018.  In 2020, the hospital accelerated the development of its new $1.5 billion "Pavilion" site in order to build additional capacity to combat the COVID-19 crisis.

Reputation 
The Hospitals of the University of Pennsylvania-Penn Presbyterian (HUP/PPMC) are ranked among the nation's top hospitals by U.S. News & World Report in 2019. HUP/PPMC is ranked #18 in the nation in the publication's prestigious annual "Honor Roll." The Hospitals of the University of Pennsylvania-Penn Presbyterian were nationally ranked for excellence in 12 specialties.

Penn Medicine's hospitals are all recognized as among the best regionally. In the Philadelphia metro area, HUP/PPMC is ranked #1, Pennsylvania Hospital is ranked #4, and Chester County Hospital is ranked #6.

Beyond Philadelphia, Lancaster General Hospital (LGH) is ranked #1 in the Lancaster, Pennsylvania metropolitan area while Princeton Health is ranked #11 in the state of New Jersey.

Notable births, deaths, and hospitalizations

Births
Nancy Spungen, girlfriend of punk rock musician Sid Vicious

Hospitalizations
Kimmo Timonen, National Hockey League player

Deaths
George Rarclay, professional baseball player
Pete Carril, professional and college basketball coach
Britton Chance, biochemist
Kathy Change, political activist and writer
Jim Johnson, professional football defensive coordinator, Phoenix Cardinals, Indianapolis Colts, Philadelphia Eagles, and Seattle Seahawks 
Gary Papa, Philadelphia television sportscaster
David Ruffin, vocalist, The Temptations
Andy Smith, college football coach
Piers Wedgwood, 4th Baron of Wedgwood

See also
 Penn Presbyterian Medical Center ("Presby") - A separate hospital, located nearby, that is part of the Penn Health System.
 Pennsylvania Hospital ("Pennsy") - A separate hospital, on a different campus, that is also part of the Penn Health System. Founded in 1751, it is billed as "America's first hospital."

References

External links 
 Official site

Hospital buildings completed in 1874
Hospitals in Philadelphia
Teaching hospitals in Pennsylvania
Perelman School of Medicine at the University of Pennsylvania
Hospitals established in 1874
University City, Philadelphia
1874 establishments in Pennsylvania
Hospital buildings completed in 2020